Welf is a Germanic first name that may refer to:
Welf (father of Judith), 9th century Frankish count, father-in-law of Louis the Pious 
Welf I, d. bef. 876, count of Alpgau and Linzgau
Welf II, Count of Swabia, died 1030, supposed descendant of Welf I
Welf, Duke of Carinthia (Welf III), died 1055, son of Welf II
Welf I, Duke of Bavaria (Welf IV), died 1101, nephew of Welf of Carinthia and son of Albert Azzo II, Margrave of Milan|Azzo II of Este
Welf II, Duke of Bavaria (Welf V), died 1120, son of Welf I of Bavaria
Welf VI, died 1191, Duke of Spoleto and Marchese of Tuscany, nephew of Welf II of Bavaria
Welf VII, died 1167, Duke of Spoleto, son of Welf VI

Welf was also the name of two related dynasties:
Elder House of Welf, dynasty of European rulers in the 9th through 11th centuries to 1055
House of Welf, European dynasty that included many German and British monarchs from the 11th to 20th century

Germanic given names

da:Welf
sv:Welf